Popjustice: 100% Solid Pop Music is a compilation album released on 23 October 2006. The album is a non-stop mix mixed by Xfm DJ Grant McSleazy, and is one of the first released on the newly formed Fascination Records. It features exclusive songs by Client, Sophie Ellis-Bextor, Girls Aloud and Pet Shop Boys. The track list was arranged by the editor of the Popjustice website.

Track listing
Rihanna – "SOS (Rescue Me)"
The Automatic – "Monster" (Culprit One remix)
Sugababes – "I Bet You Look Good on the Dancefloor" (Arctic Babes mix)
Girls Aloud  – "Love Machine" (demo version)
Annie – "Me Plus One"
Alesha – "Lipstick"
Ladytron – "Destroy Everything You Touch"
Franz Ferdinand – "Do You Want To"
Justice vs. Simian – "We Are Your Friends"
Client – "Lights Go Out"
The Similou – "All This Love" (The Drill Mix)
The Pussycat Dolls – "Hot Stuff (I Want You Back)"
STEFY – "Chelsea"
Pet Shop Boys – "It's a Sin" (Barfly Version)
Rachel Stevens – "Some Girls"
Britney Spears – "Do Somethin'"
Kelly Clarkson – "Since U Been Gone" (Jason Nevins radio edit)
Scissor Sisters – "Mary" (Junkie XL radio edit)
Nelly Furtado – "Maneater" (radio version)
The Killers – "Mr. Brightside" (Jacques Lu Cont's Thin White Duke edit)
Sophie Ellis-Bextor – "Dear Jimmy"
Girls Aloud – "Biology" (Radio Edit)
Girls Aloud – "Biology" (Tony Lamezma remix)

2006 compilation albums
Pop compilation albums
Fascination Records compilation albums